The Bayer designation Delta Lyrae (δ Lyr / δ Lyrae) is shared by a star and a star system, in the constellation Lyra (constellation):
δ¹ Lyrae
δ² Lyrae

Lyrae, Delta
Lyra (constellation)